Ian Robert Wiles (born 28 April 1980) is an English footballer who plays as a defender, most recently for Heybridge Swifts. Wiles has played in the Football League for Colchester United.

Career

Born in Woodford, London, Wiles came through the youth ranks at Colchester United, performing well enough to earn a professional contract for the 1998–99 season. He made his only professional appearance as an 89th-minute substitute for Paul Abrahams in a 4–2 away win against Wrexham on 15 August 1998. Wiles made the bench a few more times but failed to break into the first-team under Mick Wadsworth and was released in 2001.

Wiles joined Heybridge Swifts for the first of three spells with the club in their Isthmian League Cup winning season of 2000–01. He later spent two years with Chelmsford City before a stint with Conference South side Welling United. He then returned to Heybridge for a second stint but left once again in May 2008, joining Braintree Town and AFC Hornchurch before returning for a final time to the Swifts in December 2008. He departed the club in February 2009.

References

1980 births
Living people
Footballers from Woodford, London
English footballers
Association football defenders
Colchester United F.C. players
Heybridge Swifts F.C. players
Chelmsford City F.C. players
Welling United F.C. players
Braintree Town F.C. players
Hornchurch F.C. players
English Football League players
National League (English football) players